The Nepal Trade Union Congress (NTUC) a national trade union center in Nepal. Founded in 1947, it was the first and largest trade union confederation in country. The NTUC is politically linked with the Nepali Congress (NC).

In 2008, the NTUC and the Democratic Confederation of Nepalese Trade Unions (DECONT) merged to form the NTUC-Independent (DECONT had split from the NTUC in 1997). While still known as NTUC-I, the union has reverted to the former name.

The 6th National Congress was held on June 12–15, 2018 in Kathmandu, which elected Pushkar Acharya as president. NTUC has 26 sectoral unions and 7 province committees.

Current affiliates  

The following are the vector unions of Nepal Trade Union Congress:

 Nepal Teachers Association (NTA) 
 Nepal factory Workers union (NFWU) 
 Construction and Allied Workers Union of Nepal (CAWUN) 
 Agriculture workers union of Nepal (AWUN) 
 Nepal Tourism, Hotel, Casino and Restaurant Workers Union (NTHCRWU)
 Union of Public Services in Nepal (UPSIN) 
 Nepal Embroidery Handicraft & Sewing Knitting Workers' Union (NEHSKWU) 
 Nepal Tea Garden Labour Union (NTGLU) 
 Financial Institute Employees Union (FIEUN) 
 Barber Union of Nepal (BUN) 
 Nepal Customs & Airport Allied workers union (NCAWU) 
 Health Professional Union of Nepal (HEPON) 
 Nepal Carpet Workers Union (NCWUN) 
 Nepal Transport Workers Union (NETWON) 
 Nepal Garment Workers Union (NGWU) 
 Nepal Beautician Union (NBU) 
 Nepal Printing Press & Allied Workers Union (NPPAWU) 
 Nepal Commercial and Allied Workers Union (NCAWU) 
 Nepal Press Union (NPU) 
 Nepal Home Workers Union (NHWU) 
 Nepal Rickshaw and Puller Workers Union (NRAPWU) 
 Nepal Film Workers Union (NFWU) 
 Nepal Porter Union (NPU) 
 Nepal Cultural and Art Workers Union (NCAAWU) 
 Nepal National Security Guard Workers Union (NNSGWU)
 Agriculture workers union of Nepal (AWUN)

References

National trade union centers of Nepal
International Trade Union Confederation 
Nepali Congress
Trade unions established in 1947
Trade unions disestablished in 2008
Trade unions in Nepal
1947 establishments in Nepal